Howard William Phillips (20 April 1872 – 17 March 1960) was an English first-class cricketer. Phillips was a right-handed batsman.

Phillips made his first-class debut for Hampshire against Leicestershire in the 1889 County Championship. From 1899 to 1902 Phillips played five first-class matches for Hampshire, with his final first-class appearance for the county coming in the 1902 County Championship against Kent.

Shortly thereafter, Phillips moved to South Africa. There he joined Border, making his debut for the province against Transvaal. Phillips represented Border in twelve first-class matches. Phillips final appearance for the province came against the touring Marylebone Cricket Club in 1913. During his time with Border, Phillips scored 223 runs at an average of 11.15, with a high score of 47. In his overall first-class appearances, Phillips scored 267 runs at an average of 9.51, with his high score of 47 for Border ending up as his highest first-class score.

Phillips died at East London, Cape Province on 17 March 1960.

External links
Howard Phillips at Cricinfo
Howard Phillips at CricketArchive
Matches and detailed statistics for Howard Phillips

1872 births
1960 deaths
Sportspeople from the Isle of Wight
English cricketers
Hampshire cricketers
Border cricketers